Merlin Plage–Shimano–Flandria was a French professional cycling team that existed in 1974. It was linked to the Belgian team . It participated in the 1974 Tour de France, with Cyrille Guimard winning a stage.

Team roster
The following is a list of riders on the Merlin Plage squad during the 1974 season, with age given for 1 January 1974.

References

Cycling teams based in France
Defunct cycling teams based in France
1974 establishments in France
1974 disestablishments in France
Cycling teams established in 1974
Sports clubs disestablished in 1974